Marek Kopecký (born 19 February 1977), is a Czech futsal player who plays for Bohemians and the Czech Republic national futsal team. Kopecký played for SK České Budějovice in the Gambrinus liga for three seasons between 1997 and 2001.

References

External links
UEFA profile

1977 births
Living people
Czech footballers
Czech First League players
SK Dynamo České Budějovice players
Czech men's futsal players
Association footballers not categorized by position